Vennesla is the administrative centre of Vennesla municipality in Agder county, Norway. The village itself extends for about  along both sides of the river. The Sørlandsbanen railway line passes through Vennesla, stopping at Vennesla Station. The lake Venneslafjorden is located on the river Otra (due to a dam on the river) in the northern part of the village of Vennesla.

The village of Vennesla has significant industry, and nearby along the river Otra there are several hydroelectric power plants. The village has considerable government, commercial, and service industries as well as the Vennesla high school which has both general and vocational classes. Vennesla Church is located in the village, serving as the main church for the municipality. The Vennesla Library and Culture House was completed in 2011. The football club of Vennesla is Vindbjart FK, founded in 1896. Vindbjart plays in the Norwegian Second Division at a Moseidmoen stadium in Vennesla.

Statistics Norway includes the  Mosby area in nearby Kristiansand municipality as part of the whole  urban area of Vennesla. The whole urban area has a population (2016) of 12,816 which includes 2,307 people who live in Mosby.

Town status
The "village" of Vennesla has 12,816 residents in 2016 which makes it one of the largest urban areas in the county, and it is much larger than many towns in Southern Norway. There has been political talk of granting town status to Vennesla, but there was little support, so politicians have not pursued the cause.

References

Villages in Agder
Vennesla